A troop carrier is a means of transporting soldiers. A troop carrier vehicle may be configured for troop transport while used for other purposes at other times.

Examples

The Douglas C-47 Skytrain is an aircraft used as a troop carrier; the Boeing CH-47 Chinook is a helicopter designed for it, though often used for other purposes.  Military transport aircraft evolved from bombers.

The Toyota Land Cruiser (J70) and Nissan Patrol are four-wheel drive vehicles that have troop carrier models.

A troopship is a ship that serves the purpose.

Armoured personnel carriers also are troop carriers.

The Leamington Transit was an electric railway in Canada that carried troops during World War I.

Broad-concept articles
Military transport
Military vehicles by type